Karen Watkins (née Jones, born 1948), writing as Catrin Collier, is a Welsh novelist known for her historical works, especially those in the Hearts of Gold series, set in her home town of Pontypridd between 1930 and 1950, the first of which was adapted as a BBC drama in 2003. She also writes under the pen names Katherine John/ K. A. John (crime novels), Katherine Hardy (novelisations of television programmes) and Caro French (modern fiction).

Early life 

Collier is of East Prussian descent, with her mother, Gerda Salewski, born in Allenstein, East Prussia, in 1926. Her father, Glyn Jones, was a Welsh Guardsman serving in Germany when he met Gerda. They were married in Pontypridd in July 1947. Collier was born there in 1948 and grew up in the town.

As a comprehensive school teacher, she taught English and drama to A level in schools in Swansea and West Glamorgan.

Career

Her book One last Summer is based on war-time diaries kept by her mother and maternal grandmother. and is recommended by the Holocaust Memorial Day Trust for young people wanting to learn about the Holocaust . It was a 2008 finalist for the Romantic Novelists' Association's Book of the Year.

Television 

In 2003, Hearts of Gold was adapted by BBC Wales as a two-part drama, directed by Richard Laxton and co-written by Matthew Baylis. BBC Wales' head of drama Matthew Robinson described her as "the Catherine Cookson of Wales".

Other work

As well as novels, she writes short stories, plays and non-fiction, and has had work published in magazines including published in Woman, Woman's Own and Woman's Weekly.

Personal life

After living in Germany and America, Collier now lives on the Gower Peninsula, near Swansea. She is represented by the literary agency Marjacq Scripts.

She is a member of Swansea Writers' Group, which encouraged her from the outset of her career before she had published a novel.

, an adult education centre in Pontypridd, was named in her honour in 2002.

Bibliography 

Collier's work includes:

 'Hearts of Gold' series
 
 
 
 
 
 
 
 
 Swansea trilogy
 
 
 
 'Beggars & Choosers' series
 
 
 
 
 Tiger Bay

As Katherine John 

 'Trevor Joseph' series:
 
  (aka Midnight Murders)
 
 
  (aka Six Foot Under)
 
 
 
  (aka By Any Name)

As K. A. John

As Katherine Hardy 

 'The Grand'

As Caro French 

The Farcreek Trilogy

References

External links 

 
 Collier's works on Goodreads
 'Hearts of Gold' at the BBC website
 BBC 'Hearts of Gold' press pack

Living people
1948 births
British people of German descent
British people of Prussian descent
Date of birth missing (living people)
People from Pontypridd
People from Swansea
Welsh crime novelists
Welsh television writers
British women television writers